St. Xavier is an unincorporated community and census-designated place (CDP) in Big Horn County, Montana, United States.  The CDP population was 83 at the 2010 census.

Geography
It is located on the Crow Indian Reservation along the Bighorn River.

Demographics

As of the census of 2000, there were 67 people, 20 households, and 18 families residing in the CDP. The population density was 12.0 people per square mile (4.6/km). There were 36 housing units at an average density of 6.5 per square mile (2.5/km). The racial makeup of the CDP was 38.81% White, 52.24% Native American, 7.46% from other races, and 1.49% from two or more races. Hispanic or Latino of any race were 22.39% of the population.

There were 20 households, out of which 55.0% had children under the age of 18 living with them, 70.0% were married couples living together, 15.0% had a female householder with no husband present, and 10.0% were non-families. 10.0% of all households were made up of individuals, and none had someone living alone who was 65 years of age or older. The average household size was 3.15 and the average family size was 3.33.

In the CDP, the population was spread out, with 32.8% under the age of 18, 13.4% from 18 to 24, 31.3% from 25 to 44, 16.4% from 45 to 64, and 6.0% who were 65 years of age or older. The median age was 28 years. For every 100 females, there were 67.5 males. For every 100 females age 18 and over, there were 95.7 males.

The median income for a household in the CDP was $19,722, and the median income for a family was $19,722. Males had a median income of $11,250 versus $15,500 for females. The per capita income for the CDP was $11,578. There were 25.0% of families and 40.7% of the population living below the poverty line, including 70.4% of under eighteens and none of those over 64.

Notable person
 Tuff Harris, safety for the Miami Dolphins football team

References

Census-designated places in Big Horn County, Montana
Census-designated places in Montana